Junggok Station is a station on the Seoul Subway Line 7. It is the closest station to Daewon Foreign Language High School.

Station layout

Metro stations in Gwangjin District
Seoul Metropolitan Subway stations
Railway stations opened in 1996